An origination fee is a payment associated with the establishment of an account with a bank, broker or other company providing services handling the processing associated with taking out a loan.

An origination fee is typically a set amount for any account. However, an origination fee usually varies from 1.0% to 5.0% of a given loan amount, depending on whether the loan was originated in the prime or the subprime market. For example, an origination fee of 10% on a $10,000 loan is $1,000.
Discount points are used to buy down the interest rates, temporarily or permanently. Origination fees and discount points are both items listed under lender-charges on the HUD-1 Settlement Statement. Regulation Z was enacted to protect buyers from abusive lending practicing with regards to origination fees and origination fees for mortgages can not be deducted.

Notes

Banking